A prolonged and widespread tornado outbreak sequence affected a large portion of the United States in late-May 2013. The outbreak was the result of a slow-moving but powerful storm system that produced several strong tornadoes across the Great Plains states, especially in Kansas and Oklahoma. Other strong tornadoes caused severe damage in Nebraska, Missouri, Illinois, and Michigan. The outbreak extended as far east as Upstate New York. 27 fatalities were reported in total, with nine resulting from tornadoes (eight in Oklahoma and one in Arkansas).

By far the most significant tornado of the outbreak was an extremely large EF3 tornado that struck areas near the town of El Reno, Oklahoma on May 31. The twister was responsible for eight deaths, including famous storm chaser Tim Samaras, his son Paul, and Carl Young as a result of being caught off-guard by the tornado's unprecedented width. In addition, the tornado caused 151 injures.

Meteorological synopsis
On May 22, an upper-level low moved eastward over the Western United States, with forward progression limited by a blocking high around the Northern Plains and Great Lakes. With ample low-level moisture streaming north ahead of the low into an area of moderate instability, scattered severe weather was anticipated over parts of Colorado, Kansas, and Nebraska starting on May 24.

The first tornado associated with the system was a small landspout tornado that touched down in rural Idaho on May 26. The tornadic activity became more intense the following day. On May 27, while only scattered tornadoes touched down, four of them were strong and caused considerable damage in parts of Kansas and Nebraska. One tornado near Lebanon, Kansas reached EF3 intensity, and an EF2 near Marysville caused major damage to several structures. In Nebraska, the town of Edgar took a direct hit from an EF2.

Vigorous tornado activity continued on May 28. While the Storm Prediction Center only issued a slight risk that day, widespread tornadoes touched down in several states, some strong to violent. Several powerful supercell thunderstorms developed in central Kansas that afternoon, and large tornadoes were reported. Near the town of Corning, a strong EF3 carved an unusual V-shaped path through rural areas west of town, and completely destroyed two homes. An even larger tornado, an EF3 wedge that was over a quarter mile wide, touched down just west of Bennington, and remained nearly stationary in a field for over an hour. This tornado resulted in relatively moderate damage, but killed over 100 head of livestock. The tornado was originally rated EF4 based on mobile radar readings, but ground surveys did not reveal damage indicative of EF4 wind speeds, and the tornado was downgraded to an EF3 as a result. Later that evening, large tornadoes were sighted in southern Michigan, prompting several tornado emergencies. A total of six tornadoes were confirmed to have touched down in areas near Flint, two of which reached EF2 intensity and caused significant damage. Numerous weak tornadoes were documented in other states.

On May 29, the Storm Prediction Center issued a moderate risk for parts of Texas, Oklahoma, and Kansas. The outlook included a 10% hatched risk for tornadoes. A separate slight risk was issued for parts of New England. In the main risk area, only scattered weak tornadoes touched down, though a mile-wide EF2 wedge tornado touched down in upstate New York near Schenectady. On May 30, for the second day in a row, the Storm Prediction Center issued a moderate risk with a 10% hatched risk of tornadoes, this time for eastern Oklahoma and a small part of Kansas. Numerous tornadoes touched down in Oklahoma and Arkansas, including a few that were strong. An EF2 ripped through the Tulsa suburb of Broken Arrow, resulting in severe damage to homes and businesses. A brief EF1 near Tull, Arkansas unfortunately caused a fatality due to a falling tree.

On the morning of May 31, a strong cap was in place over much of central Oklahoma into eastern Oklahoma. With dewpoints creeping into the low 70s, the Storm Prediction Center early on considered upgrading part of the moderate risk forecast zone to a high risk forecast zone. As the day went on, there was no upgrade, but it became evident the atmosphere was ripe with CAPE values in excess of 4000 J/kg. With the presence of an extremely unstable air mass over central Oklahoma, the Storm Prediction Center issued a Particularly Dangerous Situation Tornado Watch for much of the state during the afternoon of May 31 and lasting into the night. Later that evening, severe storms rapidly developed, and an extremely large and violent multiple-vortex tornado devastated areas near El Reno, Oklahoma, and killed eight people including three men from the storm chasing crew, TWISTEX. The tornado had been rated EF5 based on mobile radar readings, Other weak tornadoes and major flooding devastated parts of the Oklahoma City metro that evening. Further north, a powerful squall line of severe storms with several embedded strong tornadoes developed in Missouri. One of the tornadoes, a large and rain-wrapped EF3, caused major damage in several St. Louis suburbs. Weak tornadoes touched down in several other states.

Confirmed tornadoes

Bennington, Kansas

A large,  very slow-moving, and erratic EF3 wedge tornado remained on the ground for just over an hour as it executed a cyclonic loop in Ottawa County south of the town of Minneapolis and west of Bennington. It initially touched down several miles west of Bennington on May 28 at 5:39 p.m. CDT (2239 UTC). Upon formation, it snapped power poles and moved southeast before turning north as it approached U.S. Route 81. As the tornado reached the northern end of the track (its strongest point), it destroyed numerous outbuildings, downed trees and power poles, damaged farm equipment, and tipped over a large semi-like truck while also moving the truck several feet. About 100 cattle were killed in this area as well. The tornado then moved to the southwest and destroyed the roof of a well constructed shed and throwing the heavy metal shed door into a field, blew a trailer , snapped many more power poles, and downed numerous trees. A home that was under construction lost all four exterior walls and a fifth-wheel camper was blown . A second home suffered minor shingle damage and impact dents in the siding from flying debris, a few more sheds/outbuildings were either damaged or destroyed, and a third home had siding and chimney damage (mostly from debris impact) and was slightly moved off of the foundation. The tornado lifted around 6:45 p.m. CDT (2345 UTC), just to the south-southwest of where it touched down.Initially, the tornado was rated as an EF4, with the rating based on Doppler on Wheels surface wind measurements, which indicated a far larger and stronger tornado. However, DOW windspeed measurements were found to be almost 264 mph (47m above ground level). Because mobile doppler radar data is not a method by which tornadoes are rated, it was later officially downgraded to an EF3. Despite the downgrade, the National Climatic Data Center maintains that the Bennington tornado was violent, and likely reached EF4 intensity at some point in its life. The wind gusts above the surface were among the highest ever measured/estimated on record, comparable to the highest non-tornadic gust of  measured during Cyclone Olivia in 1996. Some damage was observed from areas that were not directly in the path of the tornado, suggesting a very large wind field as well.

El Reno, Oklahoma

The tornado initially touched down at 6:03 p.m. The storm rapidly grew and became violent. Remaining over mostly open terrain, the tornado did not impact many structures; however, measurements from mobile Doppler radars revealed extreme winds in excess of  within the tornado. After crossing Interstate 40, the tornado dissipated around 6:43 p.m. An EF2 anticyclonic satellite tornado also occurred and such companion tornadoes tend to be observed with especially large and intense tornadoes.

Although the tornado remained over mostly open terrain, dozens of storm chasers unaware of its immense size were caught off-guard. Along US 81, renowned chaser and researcher Tim Samaras, along with his son Paul and research partner Carl Young, were killed when their vehicle was tossed by the tornado or a sub-vortex associated with it. Another amateur storm chaser was killed in the area. Other storm chasers, including The Weather Channel's Mike Bettes as well as Reed Timmer, were either injured or had their vehicles damaged. Overall, the tornado was responsible for eight fatalities and an unknown number of injuries.

Weldon Spring–Northern St. Louis County, Missouri

This large rain-wrapped tornado touched down at 7:50 p.m. CDT (0050 UTC) on May 31, southwest of Weldon Spring in St. Charles County, Missouri. It first produced EF1 damage as it downed trees, blew over empty trailers, and caused minor damage to construction equipment. It moved generally east-northeast into Weldon Spring Heights (on the south side of Weldon Spring) and caused roof, window, and solar panel damage to a few structures as well as downing more trees before crossing Interstate 64. The tornado continued moving east-northeast through densely populated residential areas of southern St. Charles County. Roofing was torn off of a middle school and blown , many houses suffered varying degrees of roof (from minor damage to removal of entire roof), wall (from minor damage to total collapse), and overall structural damage, and hundreds of trees were downed. Damage in this area ranged from EF1 to EF2. A shed was destroyed, a garage door was compromised and the roof was removed and blown away, another garage had a wall collapsed, and two more garages were completely destroyed. The tornado reached its maximum intensity to the east-northeast of Weldon Spring, west-southwest of St. Charles and Harvester, and south of St. Peters. Three adjacent frame homes at this location sustained total loss of their roofs and exterior walls, and this small pocket of damage was rated EF3. The tornado continued causing damage in residential areas further to the east and northeast, snapping many trees and causing roof and wall damage to many homes. A few homes had their roofs entirely ripped off, and damage along this portion of the path was rated EF1 to EF2. Crossing the Missouri River, the tornado moved into St. Louis County and Earth City, Bridgeton, and the northern side of Maryland Heights as it moved along Interstate 70 near its intersection with Interstate 270.

The tornado produced a mixture of EF1 and EF2 damage in this densely built-up commercial and industrial area. A casino on the east bank of the river had roof and siding damage and a tree limb was thrown into one of the walls. Many trees, power poles, and highway signs were downed in the area, a hotel sustained shingle and window damage, and the canopy was damaged at a Mobil gas station. The roof was damaged and windows were broken at an ITT Technical Institute building and a vehicle was flipped in the parking lot. Nearby, large doors were blown in at a warehouse-type building and three delivery trucks were blown over. Trees and power lines were downed and several homes and commercial buildings were damaged at mainly EF1 strength in nearby Bridgeton to the east of SSM DePaul Health Center. One apartment building in Bridgeton sustained EF2 damage, and debris fell onto vehicles and trees fell onto houses in the area as well. The tornado weakened to EF1 strength and maintained this intensity for the remainder of its path. It moved just north of the St. Louis base of the Missouri Air National Guard at Lambert–St. Louis International Airport in Berkeley (which had previously taken a direct hit from an EF4 tornado on April 22, 2011), causing tree and power pole damage. The tornado moved into residential areas on the northern side of Ferguson,  downing trees and power poles, a few of which landed on homes and cars. More trees were downed and one home suffered minor roof damage in the Dellwood area. The tornado downed even more trees as it crossed Interstate 270 again east of Florissant. Several trees landed on houses in the area and seven power poles were snapped along the interstate. The tornado moved north of Bellefontaine Neighbors, then northeast of town as it moved along Interstate 270.  in diameter trees were downed, one of which fell onto a house. It moved due east, causing widespread tree damage as it moved into the Riverview area in the extreme northeastern sections of the City of St. Louis. The tornado downed many trees on the banks of the Mississippi River, where it lifted at 8:25 p.m. (0125 UTC) just northeast of exit 34 on Interstate 270. Two minor injuries occurred in St. Charles County.

Non-tornadic events
On May 28, Amarillo, Texas was battered by a major hailstorm. An estimated 35,000 vehicles and thousands of homes were damaged in the storm, with insured losses expected to reach $400 million.

In addition to the tornadoes, the Oklahoma City metro area was subjected to severe flash flooding on May 31 and into the early morning hours of June 1, with initial estimates of 7 to 12 inches of rain having fallen as storms continued to train across the area during the evening and overnight hours. The flooding combined with damage from the tornadoes complicated efforts of emergency services personnel to render aid to areas impacted by the storm. With the flooding and tornadoes occurring simultaneously, a family of seven sought refuge from a tornado in a drainage ditch in southern Oklahoma City. They were soon overwhelmed by flood waters and a four-year-old boy was swept away and died. An infant was also swept away but was rescued and hospitalized in critical condition. At least nine people were killed as a result of the floods. One person remained missing as of June 3. This became the deadliest floods in Oklahoma since 1984.

On May 29, a man was killed by a falling tree in Verona, New York during a severe thunderstorm. Flash flooding in Scott County, Arkansas killed four people, including a sheriff. Missouri authorities confirmed three deaths as a result of high water that occurred in the counties of Lawrence, Miller and Reynolds.

Aftermath
More than 210,000 customers were left without power: 89,000 in Missouri, 86,000 in Oklahoma, 31,000 in Illinois, 3,000 in Arkansas, 1,000 in Kansas, and 500 in Indiana. According to the state transportation department, portions of more than 200 roads in Oklahoma were closed due to flooding. On May 31, the National Oceanic and Atmospheric Administration (NOAA) announced it would no longer furlough employees under sequestration due to the outbreak of tornadoes. A baseball game between The Saint Louis Cardinals and San Francisco Giants was postponed due to the storm. Another baseball game between the Texas Rangers and Arizona Diamondbacks was postponed.

See also
 List of North American tornadoes and tornado outbreaks
 List of tornadoes with confirmed satellite tornadoes
Tornado outbreak of May 18–21, 2013 – a similar outbreak that occurred around a week earlier

Notes

References

External links
Storm Chasing Account of Bennington Tornado with Additional Photos

Tornadoes of 2013
Tornadoes in Kansas
Tornadoes in Missouri
Tornadoes in Oklahoma
F3 tornadoes
Tornado outbreaks
2013 in Kansas
2013 in Missouri
2013 in Oklahoma
2013 natural disasters in the United States
Disasters in Oklahoma
May 2013 events in the United States
Satellite tornadoes